Joseph "Mad Dog" Taborsky (March 23, 1924 – May 17, 1960) was a serial killer who was sentenced to death after a string of robberies and murders in Connecticut during the 1950s. Six people were killed during these events, which became known as the "Mad Dog Killings."  A number of others were shot, beaten, or pistol-whipped but survived.  Taborsky earned his nickname due to the savagery of the killings that condemned him to death. In 1957, Connecticut package store hours were modified to close from 8:00 p.m. to 11:00 p.m. due in part as a response to the crimes of Taborsky and his partner Arthur "Meatball" Culombe.  

He was executed by electric chair at the age of 36.  His execution in 1960 was the last in Connecticut (and in New England) until that of Michael Bruce Ross in 2005.  Taborsky donated his body to Yale School of Medicine, and his ashes were later buried in the garden of Christ Church Cathedral.

First time on death row
Taborsky is an anomaly in Connecticut death penalty lore. He is the only convict sent to death row twice, for different crimes. Taborsky first came to Connecticut's death row for the 1950 murder of Louis Wolfson, a West Hartford liquor store owner during a robbery. His younger brother Albert, who was also his co-conspirator, testified against Taborsky at the trial in exchange for a life sentence.  In prison Albert exhibited signs of mental illness and was institutionalized.  

Joseph Taborsky, having learned through the prison grapevine that his brother Albert wound up in an insane asylum, appealed his case.  In 1955, the Connecticut Supreme Court reversed Taborsky's conviction (and death sentence) because the sole witness against him - Albert - was incurably insane.  Because there were no other witnesses to the robbery and murder of Wolfson, Taborsky could not be tried again.

Thus, he was freed from death row, after less than three years in early October 1955. Taborsky appeared appropriately humble, stating, "You can't beat the law. From now on, I'm not even going to get a parking ticket."

Second time on death row
After his release from prison, Taborsky met another felon, Arthur "Meatball" Culombe, who would become his accomplice during the "Mad Dog Killings". In one grocery-store robbery, a 3-year-old girl was running around the store as Taborsky beat her grandparents unconscious. When Taborsky ordered Culombe to shoot the girl, Culombe hid her beneath a deli case, told the girl to be quiet, and fired a shot into the floor. Taborsky left, believing that the girl was dead. 

Because of this incident, his low IQ, and his cooperation with the authorities, Culombe was given a life sentence. Taborsky was sentenced again to die in the electric chair on June 27, 1957. He thereby became the only convict sent to Connecticut's death row on two occasions for two crimes. On May 17, 1960, Taborsky died at age 36 in the electric chair for the "Mad Dog Killings". Before his execution, he would also confess to the 1950 murder of Wolfson. He would be the final criminal to be executed in the Connecticut "Old Sparky" electric chair.

Murder victims
 First murder:
 Louis Wolfson was killed on March 23, 1950 (on Taborsky's 26th birthday). The cause of death was a gunshot wound to the face.
 "Mad Dog" murders:
 Edward Kurpewski and Daniel Janowski were killed on December 15, 1956. They were both shot in the back of the head.
 Samuel Cohn was killed on December 26, 1956. He was killed by a gunshot wound to the chest.
 Bernard "Buster" Speyer and Ruth Speyer were killed on January 5, 1957. Both were shot in the head.
 John M. Rosenthal was killed on January 26, 1957. Like Cohn, he was shot in the chest.

See also
 List of people executed in Connecticut
 List of serial killers in the United States

References

External links
 Photograph of Joseph Taborsky
 The Mad Dog Killer
 Photograph of Connecticut Electric Chair

1924 births
1960 deaths
20th-century executions by Connecticut
20th-century executions of American people
Executed American serial killers
Executed people from Connecticut
Male serial killers
People convicted of murder by Connecticut
People executed by Connecticut by electric chair
People from Hartford, Connecticut